Sandžak TV or Sandžačka Televizija is a Serbian commercial television channel with regional coverage dedicated to local news from territory of Sandžak and Raška. Company headquarters is located in Novi Pazar, Dimitrija Tucovića bb street.

History
Sandžak TV was founded as Ekran TV on 29 December 1998. as the first television in Novi Pazar.

After 16 June 2008, television changed its name into the Universa and new owner was International University of Novi Pazar. The main idea of university television was to be a training bastion for journalists who study at the Department of Journalism at IUNP.

Since 11 May 2011., television channel changed its name to present-day Sandžak Televizija. Along with the television channel, local news agency Sanapress (Sandžak news agency), Refref radio and newspapers Glas islama and Revija Sandžak are part of local Media centar in Novi Pazar.

Current line-up
 Tema dana - daily news programme
 Pretres - weekly political talk show dedicated to events in Sandžak, Serbia, Bosnia and Herzegovina and Montenegro
 Hajrat - TV show devoted to local charity actions and humanitarian work
 Dječije radosti - kids programme
 Naši mališani - kids programme
 Vremeplov - review of important historical events
 Magazin - talk show
 Iz Svijeta sporta - weekly sports magazine
 Knjiga je moj najbolji prijatelj - TV show dedicated to literature and art

See also 
 RTV Novi Pazar
 Sandžačka TV Mreža
 Sanapress

References

External links

Television stations in Serbia
Television channels and stations established in 1999
Multilingual broadcasters
1999 establishments in Serbia